P71 may refer to
 Curtiss XP-71, an American fighter aircraft design
 Ford Crown Victoria Police Interceptor
 
 Papyrus 71, a biblical manuscript